The Sacramento Senators are a defunct U.S. soccer team which spent a single season in the Western Soccer League in 1989.  The Senators played in Sacramento, California.
Carlos Azevedo, a defender, was later entered into the Sacramento Hall of Fame in 1989.

Year-by-year

External links
 Sacramento roster

Soccer clubs in Sacramento, California
Defunct soccer clubs in California
Western Soccer Alliance teams
1989 establishments in California
1989 disestablishments in California
Soccer clubs in California
Association football clubs established in 1989
Association football clubs disestablished in 1989